Wabatongushi Lake is a lake in Northern Ontario, Canada, fully within the Chapleau Crown Game Preserve. The lake is highly diversified in its topography. The north end of Wabatongushi is shallow with many low, swampy areas. This is perfect habitat for northern pike and hungry moose. The south half of the lake is much deeper, with a maximum depth of 175' located right off of Loch Island Lodge. This set up is ideal for large game fish such as walleye and northern pike. The shoreline on the south end is much higher, with exposed Pre-Cambrian shield plummeting straight into the tea-stained water. Large schools of bait fish congregate off of these shorelines which attract the game fish.  Fishing is excellent in these locations on the south end near Loch Island Lodge.  Wabatongushi is the top lake in a chain that stretches almost 100 miles, eventually draining into lake Superior. It sits on the crest of the northern watershed. Wabatongushi Lake was a traditional transportation route from Hudson Bay to Lake Superior for both First Nations and Voyageurs. Wabatongushi in the Ojibwa language approximately means "White Sand Lake".

The Algoma Central Railway flag stop is located at the Northwest end of Wabatongushi Lake but no longer in service. Before passenger service ceased in 2015, the ACR provided train access for fishing, wildlife and wilderness vacations, and for canoeing, kayaking and other wilderness recreation. The Algoma Central Railway Passenger Train once operated from Sault Ste Marie with a mid station at Hawk Junction just east of Wawa and had a northern terminus at Hearst. The line is now for freight only. Wabatongushi Lake is about 2/3 of the way north on the route at milepost 206 north from Sault Ste Marie, approximately 42 miles north of Hawk Junction and approximately 90 miles south of Hearst. Errington's Wilderness Island is a fishing and wilderness vacation lodge on an island 1.5 miles from the Algoma Central Railway flag stop and has been in operation since the mid-1950s. 

The Canadian Pacific rail siding of Lochalsh is located at the south end of the lake and currently provides the only passenger train service to the lake with the VIA Rail Sudbury to White River train, known locally as the Budd Car.

See also
List of lakes in Ontario
Algoma Central Railway

References
 National Resources Canada

External links
 Errington's Wilderness Island Fishing & Wilderness Vacation Lodge
 Loch Island Lodge / Camp Lochalsh
 The VIA Rail Sudbury to White River Train

Lakes of Algoma District